The Harry Needle Railroad Company (HNRC) is a railway spot-hire company, based at Barrow Hill Engine Shed in Derbyshire. Prior to 2010 the company also recovered valuable spares from scrapped railway vehicles, either on the vehicle owners' sites, or at the European Metal Recycling scrapyard in Kingsbury.

HNRC was established in 1998. It adopted an orange livery. In 2002 it introduced a yellow, white and black livery.

In 2019, HNRC purchased DB Cargo UK's Worksop depot. As at October 2019, this was being used to store withdrawn InterCity 225s and Class 345s awaiting the opening of the Elizabeth line.

Fleet Details

All locomotives below are owned or were previously owned by HNRC, unless otherwise stated.

N.B. For scrapped locomotives, see below.

Scrapped locomotives

HNRC also operates as a scrap dealer, dismantling redundant locomotives and rolling stock, either on site, or at the scrapyard in Kingsbury.

References

External links

Companies based in Derbyshire
Railway companies established in 1998
Rail transport in Derbyshire
Rolling stock leasing companies
1998 establishments in England
British companies established in 1998